Lautaro Leonel Pastrán Tello (born 27 June 2002) is an Argentine-Chilean footballer who plays as a winger for Chilean club Everton de Viña del Mar.

Club career
As a youth player, Pastrán was with Godoy Cruz in his city of birth and switched to River Plate at the age of fourteen.

In February 2021, he moved to Chile and joined Everton de Viña del Mar, making his professional debut in a Copa Sudamericana match against São Paulo on 5 May. In July 2022, he signed his first professional contract.

International career
Pastrán was called up to the training microcycle on November and December 2022 of the Chile under-23 national team with views to the 2023 Pan American Games and took part in a training match against Deportes Linares, where he scored a goal.

Personal life
His parents are Angie Tello and Gustavo and has three brothers called Gonzalo, Ezequiel and Tiziano.

In September 2022, Pastrán naturalized Chilean by descent since his grandmother is Chilean.

References

External links
 

2002 births
Living people
Sportspeople from Mendoza, Argentina
Argentine sportspeople of Chilean descent
Argentine footballers
Argentine expatriate footballers
Citizens of Chile through descent
Chilean footballers
Everton de Viña del Mar footballers
Chilean Primera División players
Argentine expatriate sportspeople in Chile
Expatriate footballers in Chile
Association football forwards
Naturalized citizens of Chile